Stratford is a borough in Camden County, in the U.S. state of New Jersey. As of the 2020 United States census, the borough's population was 6,981, a decrease of 59 (−0.8%) from the 2010 census count of 7,040, which in turn reflected a decline of 231 (−3.2%) from the 7,271 counted in the 2000 census. Rowan-Virtua School of Osteopathic Medicine is located in Stratford.

Stratford was created on February 13, 1925, from portions of Clementon Township, one of seven municipalities created from the now-defunct township. The borough was named for Stratford-upon-Avon, England, by the owners of the Rural Land Improvement Company that developed the area in the 1880s.

Geography
According to the U.S. Census Bureau, the borough had a total area of 1.57 square miles (4.07 km2), all of which was land.

The borough borders Gloucester Township (north and east), Hi-Nella (north), Laurel Springs (south), Lindenwold (south and west), and Somerdale (west).

Demographics

2010 census

The Census Bureau's 2006–2010 American Community Survey showed that (in 2010 inflation-adjusted dollars) median household income was $64,297 (with a margin of error of +/− $6,575) and the median family income was $86,375 (+/− $11,140). Males had a median income of $63,879 (+/− $4,823) versus $40,243 (+/− $1,924) for females. The per capita income for the borough was $32,383 (+/− $3,556). About 4.3% of families and 6.9% of the population were below the poverty line, including 9.4% of those under age 18 and 3.7% of those age 65 or over.

2000 census
As of the 2000 U.S. census, there were 7,271 people, 2,736 households, and 1,906 families residing in the borough. The racial makeup of the borough was 88.56% White, 6.60% African American, 0.12% Native American, 2.38% Asian, 0.01% Pacific Islander, 0.87% from other races, and 1.46% from two or more races. Hispanic or Latino of any race were 3.81% of the population.

There were 2,736 households, out of which 31.8% had children under the age of 18 living with them, 54.0% were married couples living together, 11.8% had a female householder with no husband present, and 30.3% were non-families. 25.8% of all households were made up of individuals, and 8.9% had someone living alone who was 65 years of age or older. The average household size was 2.61 and the average family size was 3.18.

In the borough, the population was spread out, with 24.7% under the age of 18, 8.1% from 18 to 24, 29.8% from 25 to 44, 21.6% from 45 to 64, and 15.8% who were 65 years of age or older. The median age was 38 years. For every 100 females, there were 95.1 males. For every 100 females age 18 and over, there were 89.3 males.

The median income for a household in the borough was $50,977, and the median income for a family was $57,500. Males had a median income of $42,246 versus $29,153 for females. The per capita income for the borough was $21,748. About 2.5% of families and 4.6% of the population were below the poverty line, including 3.8% of those under age 18 and 4.4% of those age 65 or over.

Government

Local government
Stratford is governed under the Borough form of New Jersey municipal government, which is used in 218 municipalities (of the 564) statewide, making it the most common form of government in New Jersey. The governing body is comprised of a Mayor and a Borough Council, with all positions elected at-large on a partisan basis as part of the November general election. A Mayor is elected directly by the voters to a four-year term of office. The Borough Council is comprised of six members elected to serve three-year terms on a staggered basis, with two seats coming up for election each year in a three-year cycle. The Borough form of government used by Stratford is a "weak mayor / strong council" government in which council members act as the legislative body with the mayor presiding at meetings and voting only in the event of a tie. The mayor can veto ordinances subject to an override by a two-thirds majority vote of the council. The mayor makes committee and liaison assignments for council members, and most appointments are made by the mayor with the advice and consent of the council.

, the Mayor of Stratford is Democrat Josh Keenan, whose term of office ends December 31, 2023. Members of the Stratford Borough Council are Council President Patrick Gilligan (D, 2023), Stephen C. Gandy (D, 2024), Linda Hall (D, 2022), James Kelly (D, 2024), Tina Lomanno (D, 2022) and Michael G. Tolomeo (D, 2023).

Federal, state and county representation
Stratford is located in the 1st Congressional District and is part of New Jersey's 6th state legislative district. Prior to the 2011 reapportionment following the 2010 Census, Stratford had been in the 5th state legislative district.

Politics
As of March 2011, there were a total of 4,606 registered voters in Stratford, of which 1,743 (37.8%) were registered as Democrats, 849 (18.4%) were registered as Republicans and 2,013 (43.7%) were registered as Unaffiliated. There was one voter registered to another party.

In the 2012 presidential election, Democrat Barack Obama received 59.0% of the vote (1,911 cast), ahead of Republican Mitt Romney with 39.6% (1,282 votes), and other candidates with 1.5% (48 votes), among the 3,271 ballots cast by the borough's 4,925 registered voters (30 ballots were spoiled), for a turnout of 66.4%. In the 2008 presidential election, Democrat Barack Obama received 56.8% of the vote (2,006 cast), ahead of Republican John McCain, who received around 39.9% (1,409 votes), with 3,534 ballots cast among the borough's 4,639 registered voters, for a turnout of 76.2%. In the 2004 presidential election, Democrat John Kerry received 54.0% of the vote (1,886 ballots cast), outpolling Republican George W. Bush, who received around 44.3% (1,547 votes), with 3,492 ballots cast among the borough's 4,629 registered voters, for a turnout percentage of 75.4.

In the 2013 gubernatorial election, Republican Chris Christie received 67.0% of the vote (1,340 cast), ahead of Democrat Barbara Buono with 31.4% (628 votes), and other candidates with 1.6% (32 votes), among the 2,056 ballots cast by the borough's 4,945 registered voters (56 ballots were spoiled), for a turnout of 41.6%. In the 2009 gubernatorial election, Republican Chris Christie received 45.9% of the vote (1,005 ballots cast), ahead of both Democrat Jon Corzine with 45.1% (988 votes) and Independent Chris Daggett with 5.3% (116 votes), with 2,191 ballots cast among the borough's 4,630 registered voters, yielding a 47.3% turnout.

Education
The Stratford School District serves public school students in pre-kindergarten through eighth grade. Students from Hi-Nella attend the district for Pre-K–8 as part of a sending/receiving relationship, under a five-year transition that started in 2012–13, bringing in an additional 100 students to the district. Students from Laurel Springs also attend the district's schools for grades 7 and 8 as part of a sending/receiving relationship. As of the 2018–19 school year, the district, comprised of two schools, had an enrollment of 862 students and 69.1 classroom teachers (on an FTE basis), for a student–teacher ratio of 12.5:1. Schools in the district (with 2018–19 enrollment data from the National Center for Education Statistics) are Parkview Elementary School with 367 students in pre-kindergarten through third grade, and Samuel S. Yellin Elementary School with 487 students in grades 4–8.

For ninth grade through twelfth grade, public school students attend Sterling High School, a regional high school district that also serves students from Magnolia and Somerdale, along with the sending districts of Hi-Nella and Laurel Springs. The high school is located in Somerdale. As of the 2018–19 school year, the high school had an enrollment of 958 students and 69.8 classroom teachers (on an FTE basis), for a student–teacher ratio of 13.7:1.

Stratford Classical Christian Academy serves students in Kindergarten through tenth grade. John Paul II Regional School is an elementary school that operates under the auspices of the Roman Catholic Diocese of Camden, having opened for the 2008–09 school year as the result of the consolidation of Our Lady of Grace, St. Luke and St. Lawrence by the Camden diocese.

Rowan University School of Osteopathic Medicine has its campus on Laurel Road in Stratford Borough. It is made up of four buildings including the University Doctors' Pavilion and a Science Center.

Rutgers University's Biomedical and Health Sciences school has a campus in Stratford.

Transportation

Roads and highways

U.S. Route 30 (White Horse Pike) runs from Laurel Springs in the borough's southeast corner and heads towards the northern tip of the borough along the border between Stratford to the southwest and Somerdale to the northeast before heading into Somerdale.

Public transportation
NJ Transit bus service between Turnersville and Camden is available on the 403 route, with local service available on the 459 route operatining between Voorhees Town Center and the Avandale Park and Ride in Winslow Township.

Notable people

People who were born in, residents of, or otherwise closely associated with Stratford include:

 Tamika Catchings (born 1979), professional basketball player who played in the WNBA for the Indiana Fever
 Mike Daniels (born 1989), defensive end for the Green Bay Packers
 Lee DeRamus (born 1972), wide receiver who played for two seasons in the NFL with the New Orleans Saints
 Juwan Johnson (born 1996), American football wide receiver for the New Orleans Saints of the National Football League
 Ken Kelley (born 1960), American football linebacker who played two seasons in the United States Football League with the Philadelphia Stars, Chicago Blitz and Birmingham Stallions
 Brett Laxton (born 1973), former MLB pitcher who played in parts of two seasons for the Oakland Athletics and the Kansas City Royals
 Kelly Ripa (born 1970), actress and talk show host of Live! with Kelly
 Julian Talley (born 1989), NFL wide receiver for the New York Giants

References

External links

 Official Stratford website

 
1925 establishments in New Jersey
Borough form of New Jersey government
Boroughs in Camden County, New Jersey
Populated places established in 1925